The Archaeological Museum of Poros is a museum located on Koryzis Square in Poros,  Greece.

The museum was built in the 1960s on a plot of land donated by the Koryzis family. The displays of the museum date from the Mycenaean era to Roman times.

The museum contains a notable collection of artefacts dug by the French Archaeological School in Troezen.

References

External links
Hellenic Ministry of Culture and Tourism / in Greek

Poros